Ed McNally (born 7 October 1962) is a Canadian former international soccer player who played as a midfielder.

He played at club level for Toronto Blizzard, Toronto Nationals, Hamilton Steelers, Buffalo Storm and Ottawa Intrepid. In 1982, he played in the National Soccer League with Toronto Italia and assisted in securing the regular season title. In late 1983, he returned to former club Toronto Italia.

In 2014, he was inducted into the Aurora Sports Hall of Fame.

References

1962 births
Living people
Footballers from Glasgow
Scottish emigrants to Canada
Canadian soccer players
Canadian expatriate soccer players
Canada men's international soccer players
Toronto Blizzard (1971–1984) players
Hamilton Steelers (1981–1992) players
Toronto Italia players
Buffalo Storm players
Ottawa Intrepid players
Canadian National Soccer League players
Canadian Soccer League (1987–1992) players
Association football midfielders
Toronto Nationals (soccer) players
Canadian Professional Soccer League (original) players